Community Medical Center is a fully accredited acute care hospital in Toms River, New Jersey, serving the entire northern Ocean County area. The hospital is Ocean County's largest and most active healthcare facility. 

The hospital has been undergoing another expansion since 2004; when completed, the hospital will have the largest emergency department on the East Coast of the United States.

History
Opened in 1961 as Community Memorial Hospital, it was initially a small facility, with only 50 beds and 15 physicians. The center expanded in the 1980s with a five-level parking garage and a new four-story section of patient rooms.

Community Medical Center was the largest non-teaching hospital in New Jersey until July 2021, when the first round of residents were invited to the facilities under the academic medical program partnership with Rutgers University.

In 2015, Barnabas Health (parent organization of Community Medical Center) merged with Robert Woods Johnson Health System, making the Medical Center now part of RWJBarnabas Health, the largest academic health system in New Jersey.

The hospital has approximately 2,800 associates, 650 on-staff physicians, and 1,700 volunteers attending to 28,000 in-patients, 127,700 out-patients, and 100,000 emergency department patients each year.

Community Medical Center received its third Accreditation in 2002 from the Joint Commission.

Departments and Centers

Jay and Linda Grunin Neuroscience Institute 
In 2013, the Grunin Foundation bestowed the hospital with a $3.5 million gift to establish a neuroscience institute at the hospital. The institute is an interdisciplinary group of specialists whose aim is to prevent, diagnose, and treat diseases of the brain, spinal cord, and the peripheral nervous system, including:
 Stroke
 Seizure Disorders/Epilepsy
 Dementia/Alzheimer's Disease
 Movement Disorders/Parkinson's Disease
 Traumatic brain injuries (TBI)
 Neuromuscular Disorders
 Sleep Disorders
The institute operates 24 hours a day and is open year-round.

Cardiology 
Due to serving a very high population of geriatric patients, at least 75 years old, CMC treats more patients with cardiac disease than any other hospital in the state without a cardiac surgery program. Services provided include:

Non-Invasive Cardiac Lab (NICL) 
 Stress Testing
 EKG
 Cardioversion

Invasive Diagnostic Service 
 Pacemakers
 Transesophageal Echocardiogram
 Cardiac Catheterizations
 Elective and Emergent Angioplasty

J. Phillip Citta Regional Cancer Center 
The center's focus is cancer prevention, detection, and treatment. It has been nationally recognized by the Commission on Cancer of the American College of Surgeons with accreditation since 1986. Currently, the Rutgers Cancer Institute provides services at the hospital.

Therapies provided at the center include:

Inpatient Oncology Unit 
 Chemotherapy
 Biotherapy
 Radiation therapy and radioactive implants
 End-of-life care

Outpatient Infusion Center 
 Chemotherapy
 Blood and blood products transfusions
 Antibiotic infusions

References

External links

Hospital buildings completed in 1961
Hospitals in New Jersey
Toms River, New Jersey
Buildings and structures in Ocean County, New Jersey
Hospitals established in 1961